Power Rangers Dino Thunder is a 2004 action-adventure video game based on the television series of the same name, adapted from Bakuryū Sentai Abaranger. The game was developed by Natsume and Pacific Coast Power & Light and published by THQ for the Game Boy Advance, GameCube, and PlayStation 2.

Gameplay

Game Boy Advance version
The Game Boy Advance version of Power Rangers Dino Thunder is a side-scrolling fighting game with puzzle-solving mini-missions. Five rangers are featured in the game:

Red Tyranno Ranger, attacks with Tyranno Staff and has the special power to summon the TyrannoZord.
Blue Tricera Ranger, attacks with Tricera Shield and has the special power to summon the TriceraZord.
Yellow Ptera Ranger, attacks with Ptera Grips and has the special power to summon the PteraZord.
Black Brachio Ranger, solves puzzle missions to free the Cephala, Parasaur, Ankylo, and Dimetro Zords.
White Drago Ranger, acts as an enemy, blocking the Black Ranger in puzzle missions and sending his DragoZord and StegoZord in their megazord formation to fight the ThunderSaurus MegaZord.

The player fights enemies as the three core rangers while meeting goals, such as finding and rescuing humans or defeating a number of monsters while the Black Ranger solves puzzles to free captured Zords. MegaZord battles also occur whenever an enemy enlarges to giant size. MegaZord levels allow the player to customize the ThunderSaurus MegaZord with auxiliary Zords obtained from the puzzle levels.

The game features 13 missions, played across 20 levels.

Console version
The rangers pilot their Zords in various missions to save the world from Zeltrax.

Players take control of one of three Zords, Red TyrannoZord, Blue TriceraZord, or Yellow PteraZord in order to free the captive DinoZords (Violet CephalaZord, Green ParasaurZord, and Cyan DimetroZord), escort the Black BrachioZord to various warp points, and destroy alien weapon facilities. Also by collecting morphers, eggs, and crystal icons, players can unlock the zords from Power Rangers Wild Force (Red Lion Wildzord, Yellow Eagle Wildzord, Blue Shark Wildzord, Black Bison Wildzord, White Tiger Wildzord) and Power Rangers Ninja Storm (Hawkzord, Lionzord, Dolphinzord, Crimson Insectzord, Navy Beetlezord) as playable characters.

Reception

On Metacritic, each version of Power Rangers Dino Thunder has a 49 percent score, indicating "Generally unfavorable reviews."

Juan Castro of IGN rated the PlayStation 2 version 4.5 out of 10.

References

2004 video games
Disney video games
Game Boy Advance games
GameCube games
Natsume (company) games
PlayStation 2 games
Power Rangers video games
THQ games
Power Rangers Dino Thunder
Superhero video games
Video games developed in the United States
3D platform games